Hemipolygona aldeynzeri is a species of sea snail, a marine gastropod mollusk in the family Fasciolariidae, the spindle snails, the tulip snails and their allies.

Description

Distribution
Hemipolygona aldeynzeri is found near the Philippines.

References

Fasciolariidae
Gastropods described in 2001